IPHR may refer to:

Inside-the-park home run
International Partnership for Human Rights